Cesny-aux-Vignes-Ouézy was a commune of the Calvados department, France, created on 1 January 1972 from the amalgamation of the communes of Cesny-aux-Vignes and Ouézy.  On 1 January 2006, the commune was disestablished when it was split into the two original communes of Cesny-aux-Vignes and Ouézy.

References

Former communes of Calvados (department)
Populated places disestablished in 2006